Agustin Bardi (August 13, 1884 – April 21, 1941) was an Argentine Tango pianist, violinist, and composer.

Bardi was born in Las Flores district of Buenos Aires and was couched in music from a young age.

During his life he produced around 70 pieces, mainly tangos, three waltzes, and two rancheras. Around 30 of his works remain unpublished.

He was inspired to compose Qué noche (what a night) after the snowfall in Buenos Aires on June 22, 1918, (the next time snow fell on the city was July 9, 2007).

Agustín Bardi died on April 21, 1941, having suffered a heart attack near his home in Bernal. His remains are buried at Ezpeleta Cemetery.

References

External links
Todo Tango biography  
Que Noche score (with link to audio)

1884 births
1941 deaths
Argentine pianists
Male pianists
Argentine violinists
Musicians from Buenos Aires
Argentine tango musicians
20th-century pianists
20th-century violinists